Gia Guruli (born 20 May 1964 in Chiatura) is a former Georgian professional football player.

He is the father of Alexander Guruli.
He made his debut on 22 February 1994. against Israel.

Career statistics

International

References

External links

1964 births
Living people
People from Imereti
Association football forwards
Soviet footballers
Footballers from Georgia (country)
Expatriate footballers from Georgia (country)
Georgia (country) international footballers
FC Dinamo Tbilisi players
GKS Katowice players
Le Havre AC players
FC Guria Lanchkhuti players
Soviet Top League players
Erovnuli Liga players
Ligue 1 players
Ligue 2 players
Expatriate footballers in Poland
Calais RUFC players
Expatriate footballers in France
Expatriate sportspeople from Georgia (country) in Poland
USL Dunkerque players
FC Dinamo Batumi managers
Football managers from Georgia (country)